Damayanti Beshra is a Santali author and Adivasi researcher. She is known for literature of Santali language. In 2020, she was honoured by Padma Shri for her remarkable contribution to Santhali literature.

She was awarded the Sahitya Akademi Award in 2009. She also published the first  women's magazine in Santali language called Karam Dar.

She is the first female writer in the language to author and publish an anthology of poems Jiwi Jharna in 1994. She was awarded the Padma Shri in 2020.

Awards and recognition
 2009:Awarded the Sahitya Akademi Award in 2009. 
 2020: Received Padma Shri for her remarkable contribution to Santhali literature.

References

Recipients of the Sahitya Akademi Award in Santali
Living people
Santali people
Recipients of the Padma Shri in literature & education
Adivasi women
1962 births
Recipients of the Sahitya Akademi Prize for Translation